Joseph High School is a public high school in Joseph, Oregon, United States.

Academics
In 2008, 100% of the school's seniors received a high school diploma. Of 21 students, 21 graduated and none dropped out.

References

High schools in Wallowa County, Oregon
Public high schools in Oregon